Charles Peter Cousins (born 13 December 1988) is a British rower who competed at the 2012 Summer Olympics.

Rowing career
Cousins competed in the quadruple sculls at the 2012 Summer Olympics with Stephen Rowbotham, Tom Solesbury and Matthew Wells finishing in fifth place.

He competed in the 2013 World Rowing Championships in Chungju gaining a bronze medal in the men's quadruple sculls with Graeme Thomas, Sam Townsend and Peter Lambert.  At the 2014 World Championships, he won a silver medal in the same event, again with Thomas, Townsend and Lambert.  The same team won the silver medal at the 2014 European Championships.

Coaching
Cousins was a coach for the Abingdon School Boat Club.

References

External links
 

1988 births
Living people
English male rowers
Sportspeople from Cambridge
Rowers at the 2012 Summer Olympics
Olympic rowers of Great Britain
World Rowing Championships medalists for Great Britain
European Rowing Championships medalists
Staff of Abingdon School